Ma'ake Tu'amelie Kemoeatu (born January 10, 1979) is a Tongan-American former professional American football player who played as a nose tackle. He was signed by the Ravens as an undrafted free agent in 2002. He played college football for the University of Utah Utes. Kemoeatu has also played for the Carolina Panthers and Washington Redskins. He is the older brother of former NFL offensive lineman Chris Kemoeatu.

Early years
Kemoeatu was born in Tonga. His younger brother is Chris Kemoeatu, who also played football at the University of Utah and later entered the NFL. When he was a child his family moved to the U.S. state of Hawaii. He grew up in Kahuku, Hawaii, on the north shore of Oahu, and attended Kahuku High School.

College career
Kemoeatu was a four-year letterman and three-year starter at Utah. He started 35 of 43 games played in college, finishing his career with 160 tackles and nine sacks. He was suspended by the NCAA for his last college game, the 2001 Las Vegas Bowl, for buying two math books for his younger brother Tevita using scholarship money.

Professional career

Baltimore Ravens
Kemoeatu played four seasons with the Baltimore Ravens from 2002 to 2005. He was originally signed as an undrafted free agent in 2002.

Carolina Panthers
Kemoeatu signed with the Carolina Panthers as a free agent in 2006.

Kemoeatu suffered a torn right Achilles' tendon during the team's 2009 training camp. He was placed on season-ending injured reserve on August 5. He was released on March 5, 2010.

Washington Redskins
On March 13, 2010, Kemoeatu signed a two-year, $7 million contract with the Washington Redskins. He was released on July 28, 2011.

Second stint with the Baltimore Ravens
On May 2, 2012, Kemoeatu returned to the Baltimore Ravens. After a one-year hiatus from football, he lost 78 pounds, from 415 down to 337, in a serious attempt to resurrect his career. He wound up winning the starting Nose Tackle job from Terrence Cody, starting 13 games, recording 29 tackles, 1 sack and 1 forced fumble. He also would go on to win his first championship title when the Ravens won Super Bowl XLVII before retiring from football.

Personal life
He is the older brother of Chris Kemoeatu, who won Super Bowl XL and Super Bowl XLIII as a member of the Pittsburgh Steelers.

On August 27, 2014, Ma'ake donated a kidney to his brother, Chris.

Honours
National honours
  Order of Queen Sālote Tupou III, Member (31 July 2008).

References

External links
Baltimore Ravens bio
Ma'ake Kemoeatu Utah Utes bio

1979 births
Living people
Tongan emigrants to the United States
Players of American football from Hawaii
American football defensive tackles
Utah Utes football players
Baltimore Ravens players
Carolina Panthers players
Washington Redskins players
Organ transplant donors
Members of the Order of Queen Sālote Tupou III
Ed Block Courage Award recipients